Bywater is a neighborhood of the city of New Orleans.  A subdistrict of the Bywater District Area, its boundaries as defined by the City Planning Commission are: Florida Avenue to the north, the Industrial Canal to the east, the Mississippi River to the south, and the railroad tracks along Homer Plessy Way (formerly Press Street) to the west.  Bywater is part of the Ninth Ward of New Orleans.  It includes part or all of Bywater Historic District, which is listed on the National Register of Historic Places.

During New Orleans Mardi Gras, the Society of Saint Anne marching krewe starts their procession on Mardi Gras morning in Bywater and gathers marchers as it travels through the French Quarter, ending at Canal Street. This walking parade of local residents, artists, and performers is preceded by the Bywater Bone Boys Social Aid and Pleasure Club (founded 2005), an early-rising skeleton krewe made up of writers, tattoo artists, painters, set designers, musicians, and numerous other pre–7 a.m. revelers.

After Hurricane Katrina, many survivors flocked to the area as it was less affected by the storm, due to the slightly higher elevation closer to the Mississippi river. Bywater became part of what was known as the "Sliver by the River," meaning neighborhoods that saw no flooding, including Faubourg Marigny, the French Quarter and Irish Channel neighborhoods, and parts of the lower Garden District including St. Charles Avenue.

Geography

Adjacent neighborhoods
 Desire Area (north)
 Lower Ninth Ward (east)
 Holy Cross (east)
 Mississippi River (south)
 Marigny (west)
 St. Claude (west)
 Florida Area (west)

Boundaries
The traditional boundaries of Bywater are: the Mississippi River to St. Claude Avenue, and the railroad tracks along Homer Plessy Way (formerly Press Street) to the Industrial Canal. Press Street's name came from a cotton press (known elsewhere as a cotton compress) which operated here during the 19th century. The Bywater/Marigny stretch of Press Street was changed to Homer Plessy Way in 2018 to memorialize Homer Plessy, the plaintiff in Plessy v. Ferguson, the 1896 decision of the U.S. Supreme Court that upheld the constitutionality of racial segregation laws for public facilities.

Demographics
As of the census of 2000, there were 5,096 people, 2,263 households, and 1,030 families residing in the neighborhood.

As of the census of 2010, there were 3,337 people, 1,763 households, and 573 families residing in the neighborhood.

History
The area now known as Bywater was mostly plantation land in the colonial era, with significant residential development beginning the first decade of the 19th century as part of what was known as "Faubourg Washington," part of the predominantly Francophone "downtown" section of New Orleans. Many people from France, Spain, and the French Caribbean settled here. During the century, it grew with both white Creoles of French and Spanish descent, as well as mixed-race Creoles of French, Spanish, African, and Native American descent. They were also joined by immigrants from Germany, Italy, and Ireland.

Bywater is home to the site at which Homer Plessy was removed from an East Louisiana Railroad car for violating the separate car act, an event that resulted in the Plessy v. Ferguson case and the legal doctrine of "separate but equal." Today, a historical marker stands at the intersection of Press Street and Royal Street to commemorate the event.

There was little distinction between this area and what became known as the Lower 9th Ward until the Industrial Canal was dredged in the early 20th century, dividing the two.

A generation knew the area as the "Upper 9th Ward," but as other parts of the 9th Ward above the Canal farther from the River became developed, a more specific name was needed. Inspired by the local telephone exchange designation of Bywater, which fit the neighborhood's proximity to the River and the Canal, the neighborhood was known as "Bywater" by the 1940s.

Real estate development and speculation surrounding the 1984 Louisiana World Exposition prompted many long-term French Quarter residents to move down river, at first into Marigny. By the late 1990s the bohemian, artistic type of communities such as were found in the French Quarter mid-20th century had spread to Bywater, and many long-neglected 19th-century houses began to be refurbished.

Bywater and neighboring Faubourg Marigny are two of the most colorful neighborhoods in the city. The architectural styles borrow heavily from the colonial French and Spanish and have elements of Caribbean vernacular acrhitecture. This blending over the last three centuries has resulted in an architectural style unique to the city of New Orleans.

As the section of Bywater on the River side of St. Claude Avenue was one of the few portions of the 9th Ward to escape major flooding in the aftermath of Hurricane Katrina, it has made steady progress toward recovery, more so than many other parts of the city.

Notable people
 Sallie Ann Glassman artist, Voodoo priestess
 Dave Pirner of the 1990s Grunge band Soul Asylum
 Ani DiFranco singer/songwriter

See also
 Neighborhoods in New Orleans

References

External links 

 St. Roch Cemetery in the Bywater
 Bywater Neighborhood Association
 St. Claude Arts District
 Faubourg Marigny Improvement Association

Historic districts on the National Register of Historic Places in Louisiana
Downtown New Orleans
Neighborhoods in New Orleans
Louisiana populated places on the Mississippi River
New Orleans